Fuel polishing is the technical cleaning process used to remove or filter microbial contamination from oil and hydrocarbon fuel in storage. It is essentially the removal of water, sediment and microbial contamination from such fuels as diesel, red diesel and biodiesel. This fuel contamination, also known as 'fuel bugs', or 'diesel bugs', or 'so-called algae' build up over time in stored fuels if they aren't tested and treated on a regular basis. Fuel analysis should be undertaken before fuel polishing is commenced so that the exact contamination problem can be rectified with a targeted solution. A second fuel test should be performed after the fuel polishing has been completed to confirm the problem has been fixed.

Sources of contamination

 Water
 Dissolved Water
 Emulsified Water
 Free Water
 Microbial Growth (AKA Diesel Bug)
 Bacteria
 Yeast
 Mold
 Bio-films
 Solid Particle Contamination
 Rust
 Dirt
 Gums
 Wax
 Soot
 Organic Compounds

Any and all of these contaminants will eventually lead to break downs or engine failure.

These types of contamination can be introduced from many different sources throughout the supply chain of the diesel fuel as well as within the storage tank itself. Any one of these contaminants can cause complete engine failure.

In April 2010, Cathay Pacific Flight 780, an aircraft carrying over 300 passengers, had a close call when fuel contaminated with spherical particles damaged the aircraft's engines, resulting in 57 passenger injuries as the pilots had to land the aircraft at twice the normal landing speed.

Symptoms of 'diesel bugs' 
The symptoms of diesel bugs are easy to find. Important things to check over and look out for are:

 Blocked Filters
 Fuel System Failure
 Worn Fuel Injectors
 Corroded Tanks
 Engine Failure

Microbial contamination is significantly accelerated when higher biodiesel content occurs along with lower sulphur content.

Water in oil
Almost everything on Earth contains elements of water; oil and fuel are no exceptions. While very small amounts exist in fuels to start with, stored fuel will become a breeding ground for the microbial bacteria and over time, the levels of damage change from dissolved to emulsified and finally free.

 Dissolved - Dissolved water in oil is the presence of water but, unnoticeable to the eye. The water continues to develop until saturation point where water visibility begins. 
 Emulsified - At the point of saturation, a cloudy appearance will be the tell-tale sign that the water/oil mixture has become emulsified. 
 Free - The most developed stage of fuel contamination is when free-flowing puddles of water appear within stored oil. At this point, bacterial contamination and growth is boosted.

Microbial contamination 
The contaminants found in fuel can be made up of a number of organisms, predominantly Hormoconis resinae, which is typically the main contaminant when microbial contamination is present, along with bacteria Pseudomonas aeruginosa, and fungi such as yeasts and moulds like Yarrowia tropicalis.

Fuel polishing process

In essence "polishing" is an advanced level filtration of the fuel, monitored and controlled via a central processing unit. Its application ensures the need for fuel additives is either massively reduced or totally removed. A typical process involves a single pass of the fuel through different apparatus, removing increasingly finer contaminant in each stage. The application of different filter technologies is vital; a single process is not sufficient to extract the different forms of water and matter found in fuel.

During the fuel polishing process, multiple stages are required to effectively remove the solid particulates, wet foreign matter and water from the fuel. This multi-stage process ensures the high efficiency of the process; however, ensuring dense matter removal first is key, as is the removal of large matter on the suction side of the internal pumping stage. High pressurization of fuel contamination is notoriously dangerous and as such the majority of the polishing process should be carried out on the suction side. The pressure side process is often referred to as the final or finishing stage, where 2 micron particulate is removed and the fuel's final water content is extracted to within the efficiency of the filter stages. 

The amount of time required to complete the fuel polishing process depends on several factors. One of the most important is the specific fuel polishing machine used. Fuel cleaning machines can polish at rates from 8 litres per minute to upwards of 400 litres per minute, however the factors which govern the process are about more than just flow rate. In fact a high flow rate can be detrimental to the overall effect due to increased pressures in the filter stages and adverse disturbance in the fuel tank. Another factor can be the quality of the fuel. If the fuel is highly contaminated it will typically take longer to clean than a batch of cleaner fuel of the same volume. The third factor to take into account is the volume of fuel to be processed. It may seem obvious but the larger the volume of fuel that requires polishing, the longer it will take to complete the cleaning process.

See also
Particle counter

References

Aviation fuels
Fuels
Petroleum products
Filtration
Diesel fuel